The FSS Code or International Code for Fire Safety Systems is a set of international treaties organised by the International Maritime Organization (IMO) under the SOLAS Convention that are designed to reduce the risk of fire, and aid in emergency response aboard ships. Some of the components of the code were constructed after some high-profile passenger ship disasters over the last century.

Components
The FSS Code covers:

 International shore connection - specifics on how to connect to shores and ports (to refill, and to fight fires while docked).
 Personal protection - Fire fighting apparel and breathing apparatus.
 Extinguishing:
 Fire Extinguishers - Specification of portables extinguishers
 Fixed gas fire extinguishing systems
 Fixed foam fire extinguishing systems
 Fixed pressure water and water spraying systems
 Auto sprinkler, fire detection and fire alarm systems
 Fixed Emergency fire pumps
 Fixed deck foam system
 Inert gas system
 Fire detection and alarm systems
 Sample extraction smoke detection system
 Low Location Lighting system - for the lower parts of the ship
 Means of Escape

History

The FSS Code has been through some evolution:

 1914 and 1929 SOLAS Conventions after the RMS Titanic sinking
 1948 and 1960 SOLAS Conventions after the Morro Castle sinking in 1934
 International Convention for the Safety of Life at Sea of 1 November 1974, that introduced Chapter II-2 (on construction - fire protection, fire detection and fire extinction)
 1981 revision - a rewrite of Chapter II-2
 1990 MS Scandinavian Star disaster that led to a revision - Amendments to Chapter II-2 of the International Convention for the Safety of Life at Sea of 1 November 1974 (Fire Safety Measures for Existing Passenger Ships) signed in London 
 International Code for Application of Fire Test Procedures London,  on laboratory testing of systems.
 IMO Resolution MSC.327(90): 2012 Amendments to the International Code for Fire Safety Systems (FSS Code) London, 
 IMO Resolution MSC.339(91): 2012 Amendments to the International Code for Fire Safety Systems (FSS Code) London,

References

International Maritime Organization
Law of the sea
Emergency services